Bedrule Castle is a ruined 13th-century castle in the Rule Valley, in the Scottish Borders area of Scotland.

The castle was built in the 13th century by the Comyn family. During King Edward I of England’s invasion of Scotland in 1298, he stayed at the castle. On the forfeiting of the Comyn lands in 1306, the castle passed to the Douglas family.

The Douglases made the Turnbull family tenants.

Bedrule and the Turnbulls at war
On 8 November 1511, James IV of Scotland came to do justice in the Rule Valley. He captured several leading members of the Turnbull family and took them to Jedburgh. They submitted to the king with naked swords in their hands and withies about their neck. They were sent as prisoners to be warded in distant castles.

In July 1544, during the war now known as the Rough Wooing, Bedrule and 15 or 16 other steads or farms were burnt by Master Clefforth and English soldiers with men from Tynedale and Redesdale. The raiding party took 300 cattle and 600 sheep from the Rule valley and captured three field cannon called "basses" from the Laird of Ferniehirst.

On 16 September 1545 Bedrule Castle was attacked by the English again. Lord Hertford reported that "I sent forth a good band to the number of 1500 light horsemen in the leading of me [and] Sir Robert Bowes, with from 5 a.m. till 3 p.m., forayed along the waters of Tyvyote and Rowle, 6 or 7 miles beyond Jedburgh, and burnt 14 or 15 towns and a great quantity of all kinds of corn". This English incursion was a response to the Scottish victory at the battle of Ancrum Moor back in February 1545.

After the Rising of the North in England, in January 1570 Catholic fugitives were welcomed by the Laird of Bedrule at Bedrule, including Tristram Fenwyk, Robert Shafto, and Thomas Ogle. Bedrule, "a house of Sir Andrew Trumble", Andrew Turnbull, was burnt again by an English army commanded by the Earl of Sussex on 19 April 1570, during the Marian Civil War. Lord Hunsdon wrote, "we burnt also Bedrowle, which was the first house that Leonard Dacres took for his succor, when he fled out of England". Elizabeth I and her ministers claimed that this invasion was not an intervention of behalf of the infant James VI against Mary, Queen of Scots, but only a raid to punish and capture English border outlaws and fugitives and those who received them. 

The Turnbulls themselves were supporters of Regent Lennox and his grandson James VI. On 29 August 1571 the Laird of Bedrule (Thomas Turnbull) and his son (William), with many other lairds, were declared forfeited for treason by the supporters of Mary, Queen of Scots. In February 1572 Thomas Turnbull signed a band at Jedburgh to join with other lairds to support James VI and keep order on the English border, and resist the king's enemies, especially Thomas Kerr of Ferniehirst. The later historian David Hume of Godscroft describes how the Hume lairds met the Earl of Morton at Leith, and were reluctant to sign a band to join with the lawless and notorious Turnbulls of Bedrule. Soon after, the Turnbulls ransacked the house of Robert Ker of Woodhead at Ancrum and carried off his household goods, clothes, and farmstock.

In November 1572 Thomas Turnbull attended the convention at Edinburgh when the Earl of Morton was elected as Regent. Andrew Turnbull of Bedrule was involved in the Raid of the Redeswire in 1575, and Hunsdon requested he be sent into England as a pledge or hostage for the English prisoners held by Regent Morton at Dalkeith Palace. During the struggle at Redeswire, his companion, Robert Shafto, an English follower of the rebel Earl of Northumberland, was shot dead.

For a time the Turnbull family lost Bedrule. In May 1594 Harry Home of Coldenknowes sold the Castle and its lands back to Walter Turnbull and his son William Turnbull.

References

External links
 Bedrule Castle: Towers of Rule

Castles in the Scottish Borders
Castles and forts of the Rough Wooing